Charles Henry Ingham  was an American politician who served as a Socialist member of the Oklahoma House of Representatives representing Major County between 1914 and 1916. He was one of the first third party candidates elected to the Oklahoma House of Representatives alongside fellow Socialist Party Representatives David C. Kirkpatrick, N. D. Pritchett, Thomas Henry McLemore, and Sydney W. Hill.

Political career
Ingham was elected to the Oklahoma House of Representatives in 1914 as a Socialist. After losing re-election in 1916, he ran for his former seat again in 1918 and won the Socialist primary, but withdrew and was replaced with another candidate for the general election. He ran again for the seat in 1920.

Death
Ingham died on January 30, 1950 and is buried in Forrest Cemetery in Ringwood, Oklahoma.

References

20th-century American politicians
20th-century Members of the Oklahoma House of Representatives
Socialist Party members of the Oklahoma House of Representatives
Year of birth missing
1950 deaths